A rhizome is a modified subterranean plant stem that sends out roots and shoots from its nodes. 

Rhizome may also refer to:

 Rhizome (philosophy), a concept in the philosophies of Deleuze and Guattari 
 Rhizomatic learning
 Rhizome (organization), an American not-for-profit arts organization

See also
 
 Rhizoid, protuberances that extend from the lower epidermal cells of bryophytes and algae
 Mycorrhiza, a mutual symbiotic association between a fungus and a plant
 Rizome, a fictional corporation in the novel Islands in the Net